Lammermoor is a coastal locality on the Capricorn Coast in the Livingstone Shire, Queensland, Australia.

Geography

Lammermoor Beach is a long sandy beach.

Statue Rock and Statue Bay are offshore at the southern end of the beach.

The Scenic Highway is the main drive for locals and tourists which passes by the beach of Lammermoor.

Lammermoor is a steadily growing community. Several major land developments in Tarranganba and the neighbouring localities of Lammermoor and Taroombal are filling quickly with demand from the mining boom.

Many residents of Lammermoor work in Rockhampton City and live on the coast.

History
Lammermoor is part of the traditional lands of the Darumbal peoples.

Sacred Heart Catholic Primary School opened in 1958.

Prior to Local Government Amalgamations in 2008, the Capricorn Coast was administered by Livingstone Shire Council. From 2008 to 2013, it was part of Rockhampton Region. In 2014, the Shire of Livingstone was re-established and now administers Lammermoor.

Education 
Sacred Heart Catholic Primary School is a Catholic primary (Prep-6) school for boys and girls at 14 Barracuda Crescent. In 2018, the school had an enrolment of 388 students with 29 teachers (24 full-time equivalent) and 17 non-teaching staff (8 full-time equivalent).

There are no government schools in Lammermoor. The nearest government primary school is Taranganba State School in neighbouring Taranganba to the north-west. The nearest government secondary school is Yeppoon State High School in Yeppoon to the north-west.

References

Coastal towns in Queensland
Towns in Queensland
Beaches of Queensland
Shire of Livingstone
Capricorn Coast
Localities in Queensland